The Arboretum de Tigny-Noyelle is an arboretum located in Tigny-Noyelle, Pas-de-Calais, Nord-Pas-de-Calais, France. The arboretum was created in 2001 and now contains about 120 varieties of trees.

See also 
 List of botanical gardens in France

References 
 Dans le Montreuillois : L'arboretum de Tigny-Noyelle
 Opale-Sud entry (French)
 Colline Beaumont entry (French)
 French Wikipedia article for Tigny-Noyelle :fr:Tigny-Noyelle

Tigny-Noyelle, Arboretum de
Tigny-Noyelle, Arboretum de